The mysterious bird of Bobairo, named as such by Errol Fuller, is a bird in the family Paradisaeidae that is presumed to be an intergeneric hybrid between a black sicklebill and greater lophorina.  Only one adult male specimen is known of this bird, and is held in the Netherlands National Museum of Natural History in Leiden.  It derives from Bobairo, near Enarotali on Lake Paniai in the Weyland Mountains of Western New Guinea.

Notes

References
 
 

Hybrid birds of paradise
Birds of New Guinea
Intergeneric hybrids